Donald "Don" Metcalfe (15 July 1932  – 7 November 2006) was an English rugby union, and professional rugby league footballer who played in the 1950s and 1960s, and coached rugby league in the 1960s.

Background 
Donald Metcalfe was born in Wakefield, West Riding of Yorkshire, England, he was a mathematics lecturer at Wakefield College, and he died aged 74 in Wakefield, West Yorkshire, England.

Playing career

International honours
Don Metcalfe won a cap(s) for England (Under-21s) during the 1951–52 season.

County honours
Don Metcalfe won caps, and was captain for Yorkshire while at Featherstone Rovers; during the 1955–56 season against Cumberland, and during the 1956–57 season against Lancashire.

Challenge Cup Final appearances
Don Metcalfe played right-, i.e. number 3, in Featherstone Rovers' 10–18 defeat by Workington Town in the 1951–52 Challenge Cup Final during the 1951–52 season at Wembley Stadium, London on Saturday 19 April 1952, in front of a crowd of 72,093.

County Cup Final appearances
Don Metcalfe played right-, i.e. number 3, and scored 3-tries in Wakefield Trinity's 20–24 defeat by Leeds in the 1958 Yorkshire County Cup Final during the 1958–59 season at Odsal Stadium, Bradford on Saturday 18 October 1958, played  in the 16–10 victory over Huddersfield in the 1960 Yorkshire County Cup Final during the 1960–61 season at Headingley Rugby Stadium, Leeds on Saturday 29 October 1960, and played  in the 18–2 victory over Leeds in the 1964 Yorkshire County Cup Final during the 1964–65 season at Fartown Ground, Huddersfield on Saturday 31 October 1964.

Club career
Don Metcalfe made his début for Featherstone Rovers, and scored a try against Hull Kingston Rovers on Saturday 2 February 1952, he played his last match for Featherstone Rovers during the 1956–57 season, he made his début for Wakefield Trinity during April 1957, he played his last match for Wakefield Trinity during the 1968–69 season, he appears to have scored no drop-goals (or field-goals as they are currently known in Australasia), but prior to the 1974–75 season all goals, whether; conversions, penalties, or drop-goals, scored 2-points, consequently prior to this date drop-goals were often not explicitly documented, therefore '0' drop-goals may indicate drop-goals not recorded, rather than no drop-goals scored.

Contemporaneous Article Extract
"Don Metcalfe (Wakefield T.) who of course, held a berth in Featherstone Rovers'  before joining Trinity in 1957. A local product, formerly with Sandal R.U.F.C. and has represented and captained Yorkshire county."

Genealogical Information
"Four Generations. Don Metcalfe, the present Wakefield Trinity player, who joined the club from Featherstone Rovers in April 1957, continues a remarkable family association. His father, J. Metcalfe, played for Trinity some thirty years ago. Before that his grandfathers, J. D. Metcalfe and E. W. Bennett gave long and valued service and, still further back, his great-grandfather, T. O. Bennett was a player in the club's earliest days, a founder member, and at one time honorary secretary" Don Metcalfe was also the nephew of the rugby league footballer, and coach, Stan Smith.

References

External links

Search for "Metcalfe" at rugbyleagueproject.org

Don Metcalfe RIP
Photograph of Donald Metcalfe
Jimmy Metcalfe and Don Metcalfe

1932 births
2006 deaths
English rugby league coaches
English rugby league players
English rugby union players
Featherstone Rovers captains
Featherstone Rovers players
Keighley Cougars coaches
Rugby league centres
Rugby league fullbacks
Rugby league players from Wakefield
Rugby union players from Wakefield
Wakefield Trinity players
Yorkshire rugby league team captains
Yorkshire rugby league team players